Kepler-737 is an M-type main-sequence red dwarf located 671 light-years away on the border of the constellation Cygnus.

Physical properties

General properties
Kepler-737 is around half the size of the Sun, with a mass of 0.51 solar masses and a radius of 0.48 solar radii. One Kepler Object of Interest (KOI) table claimed the star to be ~14 billion years old. 

Astrometry and characteristics

Planetary system
The star has one known planet, Kepler-737b.

Kepler-737b was confirmed on May 18, 2016 from data collected earlier by the Kepler space telescope, notable for orbiting in the habitable zone but not likely to be habitable because it is tidally locked. It may, however, have atmospheric circulation that would distribute the heat around the planet, potentially making a large portion of it habitable, although given its stellar flux the most likely scenario is that the planet's surface is too hot to be habitable. Water on its surface could also distribute heat.

On the note of the Exoplanet Archive, Kepler-737b was dedicated that orbital period, transit mid-point, transit duration, Rp/Rs, and their errors are taken from DR24 KOI table.

References

Planetary systems with one confirmed planet
M-type main-sequence stars
Cygnus (constellation)
Kepler objects of interest